Peter Pan (also known as the Munson Memorial Fountain, or simply Pan) is a 1927 fountain and sculpture depicting Pan by sculptor Mary "Mae" Cook and architect Otto C. Darst, installed outside the Main Library in Columbus, Ohio, United States.

Description and history
Peter Pan, donated by local businessman Charles E. Munson in memory of his son George Peabody Munson, was completed in 1927 and dedicated on May 18, 1928. The bronze sculpture, designed by Mary "Mae" Cook, depicts Pan as a boy playing a flute. It measures approximately 3 x 1 x 1 ft. and rests on Georgia marble base that measures approximately 1 x 2 x 2 ft. Six fish are installed at the basin's foot. The fountain's basin and base measures approximately 6.5 ft. x 75 in. x 75 in. An inscription reads: "For the / children of Columbus / In memory of / George Peabody Munson / Aged six." Zenker Sons carved and installed the fountain and sculpture.

Peter Pan was surveyed by the Smithsonian Institution's "Save Outdoor Sculpture!" program in 1992.

References

External links

 

1927 sculptures
1928 establishments in Ohio
Bronze sculptures in Ohio
Fish in art
Fountains in Ohio
Monuments and memorials in Ohio
Musical instruments in art
Outdoor sculptures in Columbus, Ohio
Sculptures of children in the United States
Sculptures of Pan (god)
Statues in Columbus, Ohio